Chaves is a modern Portuguese and old Spanish word derived from Latin Flaviae (Chávez in Spanish), and may refer to:

People 
 Andia Chaves Fonnegra, Colombian marine biologist
 Avelino Chaves (1931–2021), Spanish footballer
 Esteban Chaves (b. 1990), Colombian cyclist
 Joara Chaves (b. 1962), Brazilian chess player
 Juca Chaves, Brazilian comedian
 Jussara Chaves (b. 1959), Brazilian chess player
 Manuel Chaves González (b. 1945), a Spanish politician
 Manuel Antonio Chaves (c. 1818–1889), a New Mexican soldier and United States Civil War hero
 Michael Chaves, an American filmmaker
 Ñuflo de Chaves (1518–1568), a Spanish conquistador
 Orlando Chaves (disambiguation), multiple people
 Pedro Chaves, former Formula One driver and Portuguese Rally Champion
 Rodrigo Chaves Robles (b. 1961), president of Costa Rica
 Vaimalama Chaves (b. 1994), French model and beauty pageant titleholder

Places

 Chaves, Portugal, a city and municipality in the district of Vila Real
 Chaves, Pará, a municipality in Brazil
 Chaves County, New Mexico, a county in the state of New Mexico

Other
 El Chavo del Ocho, television show
 G.D. Chaves, an association football club from Portugal

See also
 Chávez (disambiguation)
 Chávez (surname)